Aslamas Beg, also known as Aslan Khan, was a Safavid official and military commander of Georgian origin. A scion of the Orbeliani family, Aslamas was the second son of Vakhushti Khan, the former governor of Shushtar. 

He was appointed prefect (darugha) of Isfahan, the royal capital, in 1683. Known for being hostile to the Armenians, he issued a ban on non-Muslims leaving their houses and appearing in public in times of rain as they would otherwise taint believers. The ban was cancelled after the wealthy Armenian merchants of New Julfa (Isfahan's Armenian quarter) appealed to the queen mother, Nakihat Khanum. Aslamas Beg later served as the commander of the élite gholam corps (qollar-aghasi) in 1693–1695, and as the governor (beglarbeg) of Qandahar in 1694–1695, or 1696–1697. 

Aslamas's son, Mohammad-Ali Khan, briefly served as commander of the artillery (tupchi-bashi) in 1722. Aslamas's namesake grandson, who died in 1740, later served as a beglarbeg of Georgia (Gorjestan) during the reign of Nader Shah (r. 1736-1747).

Sources
 
  
 
 

17th-century births
Safavid governors of Qandahar
Safavid generals
Iranian people of Georgian descent
Shia Muslims from Georgia (country)
Nobility of Georgia (country)
Qollar-aghasi
17th-century people of Safavid Iran
Year of death unknown
Safavid prefects of Isfahan